Unjŏn County is a kun, or county, in North P'yŏngan province, North Korea.  It borders T'aech'ŏn to the north, Pakch'ŏn to the east and southeast, and Chŏngju to the north. To the south, it looks out on the Yellow Sea.  Unjŏn county was created in 1952 from portions of Pakch'ŏn county and Chŏngju city, and subsequently reorganized in 1954 and 1958.

Geography
The terrain is relatively gentle, with low mountains in the west and plains to the south and east. The highest of the western peaks is Mogusan (414 m).  The chief plain is the Unjŏn Plain (150 km2), which is formed by the 40-kilometer course of the Changp'och'ŏn stream, which flows into the Taeryŏng River.  There are several islands offshore, including Unmudo and Hyesŏngdo. Some 40% of the county's land is taken up by forestland.

Administrative divisions
Unjŏn county is divided into 1 ŭp (town) and 25 ri (villages):

Climate
The year-round average temperature is 9.1 °C, with a January average of -7.3 °C and an August average of 23.7 °C.  The climate is slightly wetter than average for North Korea, with an annual rainfall of 1230 mm.

Economy
40% of Unjŏn's area is cultivated, with extensive rice cultivation as well as maize, soybeans wheat, and barley. In addition, Unjŏn leads the province in fruit production. Its livestock industry is centred on hog farming. Fishing is also carried out, and graphite and mica are mined. There are also various factories. Salted fish and salted soy sauce are produced, and the county is known for its handicrafts and ceramics.

Transportation
The P'yŏngŭi Line of the Korean State Railway, running between Sinŭiju and P'yŏngyang, passes through Unjŏn county.

See also
Geography of North Korea
Administrative divisions of North Korea
North Pyongan

References

External links

Counties of North Pyongan